Bad Grund (Harz) is a former Samtgemeinde ("collective municipality") in the district of Osterode, in Lower Saxony, Germany. Its seat was in the village Windhausen. It was disbanded on 1 March 2013.

The Samtgemeinde Bad Grund (Harz) consisted of the following municipalities:
 Bad Grund (Harz)
 Badenhausen
 Eisdorf
 Gittelde
 Windhausen

References

Osterode (district)
Former Samtgemeinden in Lower Saxony